Leptines II (died after 342 BC), son of Leptines I, was the nephew of Dionysius the Elder.

In 351 BC, Leptines aided Callippus in successfully expelling the garrison of Dionysius the Younger from Rhegium.  After civil unrest within the city, Leptines and Polyperchon turned on Callippus stabbing him with reputedly the same sword that killed Dion. (352 BC)

In 342 BC, when Timoleon liberated Sicily, Leptines was sent into exile.  He died in Corinth.

Notes

References
 Diod. Sic., xvi 72.  
 Smith, Dictionary of Greek and Roman Biography and Mythology

Ancient Greek generals
4th-century BC Greek people
4th-century BC deaths
Year of birth unknown